Howard Watterson Gregory (November 18, 1886 – May 30, 1970) was a Major League Baseball pitcher.

External links

1886 births
1970 deaths
St. Louis Browns players
Major League Baseball pitchers
People from Hannibal, Missouri
Baseball players from Missouri
Minor league baseball managers
Springfield Midgets players
Joplin Miners players
Oakland Oaks (baseball) players
Los Angeles Angels (minor league) players
Sacramento Wolves players
Mission Wolves players
Salt Lake City Bees players
Lincoln Tigers players
San Francisco Seals (baseball) players
Lincoln Links players
Sioux City Indians players
Wichita Jobbers players
Wichita Witches players
Wichita Izzies players